Borawli is a stratovolcano with lava domes, located in Administrative Zone 2 of the Afar Region, Ethiopia. It lies above the eastern shore of Lake Afrera.

See also
List of volcanoes in Ethiopia
List of stratovolcanoes

References 
 

Mountains of Ethiopia
Stratovolcanoes of Ethiopia
Lava domes
Afar Region